Phillip Douglas Coke (born July 19, 1982) is an American former professional baseball pitcher. He played in Major League Baseball (MLB) for the New York Yankees, Detroit Tigers, Chicago Cubs, Toronto Blue Jays, and Pittsburgh Pirates.

Baseball career

College
Coke attended San Joaquin Delta College.  He was drafted by the Florida Marlins in the 49th round (1,450th overall) of the 2001 Major League Baseball Draft, but did not sign.

Minor leagues
He was drafted by the New York Yankees in the 26th round (786th overall) of the 2002 Major League Baseball Draft, and did sign.

He began his baseball career with the GCL Yankees in 2003.  By 2007, Coke had also pitched for the short season Staten Island Yankees, Class-A Charleston RiverDogs, and Class-A Advanced Tampa Yankees.

He made his Double-A debut with the Trenton Thunder in 2008, going 9–4 with a 2.54 earned run average (ERA) in 23 games (20 starts). Later that year in Triple-A with the Scranton/Wilkes-Barre Yankees, he pitched in 13 games (starting one) and went 2–2 with a 4.67 ERA.

New York Yankees
He made his major league debut on September 1, 2008, for the Yankees against the Detroit Tigers with a scoreless inning and strikeouts of Curtis Granderson and Miguel Cabrera. In 2009, Coke got his first World Series title after the Yankees defeated the Philadelphia Phillies in six games.

Detroit Tigers
On December 9, 2009, Coke was traded to the Detroit Tigers as part of a three-team trade that sent Curtis Granderson to the Yankees.

Coke's first season in Detroit proved to be successful, as he finished 2010 with a 3.76 ERA (his career best to date) with 17 holds and 2 saves in 21 hold/save situations. The Tigers signed Coke to a new contract on February 7, 2011. After spending all of his previous time in the major leagues as a relief pitcher, Coke was moved from the bullpen to the fifth spot in the starting rotation to start the 2011 season. On June 30, after accumulating a 1–8 record, Coke was moved back to the bullpen. He would finish 2011 with a 3–9 record and a 4.47 ERA.

On January 16, 2012, Coke signed a one-year, $1.1 million deal with the Tigers to avoid arbitration. He was eligible to earn an additional $50,000 based on appearances in the 2012 season.

Despite a season in which he posted a 4.00 ERA and a 1.65 WHIP, Coke was the Tiger's most reliable reliever in the 2012 postseason.  Pressed into duty as the team's closer on October 14, 2012, after regular season closer José Valverde surrendered seven runs in his previous two appearances, Coke pitched two shutout innings in Game 2 of the 2012 ALCS against the Yankees to earn a save. He then saved Game 3 by striking out Raúl Ibañez on a 3–2 slider to preserve a 2–1 victory after allowing back-to-back two-out singles. In Game 4, Coke pitched two perfect innings to finish off the Tigers' 8–1 win over his former team and send Detroit to the World Series for the first time in six years.

In the 2012 World Series, Coke pitched  innings, allowing one run, but that run came in the top of the 10th inning of Game 4 and was the game and series winner for the Champion San Francisco Giants. This came after Coke had struck out the side in the top of the ninth inning which, coupled with his appearances in Games 2 and 3 of the series, gave him a World Series record seven consecutive strikeouts. Coke finished the 2012 postseason allowing one run in  innings (0.84 ERA) and striking out 13 batters.

Coke struggled throughout the 2013 season, failing to thrive as either a setup man or a lefty specialist. Tossing only  innings on the year, Phil's ERA ballooned to a career-high 5.40. On August 20, 2013, after an outing against the Minnesota Twins that typified Coke's ineffectiveness this season, the Tigers demoted him to their Triple-A farm club in Toledo, subsequently promoting left-handed pitcher José Álvarez to the major league roster.

In 2014, his final season with the Tigers, Coke posted a 5–2 record with 41 strikeouts and a 3.88 ERA in 58 innings pitched.

Chicago Cubs
In March 2015, Coke signed a minor league contract with the Chicago Cubs, receiving a non-roster invitation to spring training. Coke earned a $2.25 million salary upon making the team. Coke had a 6.30 ERA in 16 appearances, allowing left-handed batters to hit .304 (7-for-23) against him. He was designated for assignment by the Cubs on May 18, and released by the club on May 26.

Toronto Blue Jays
On May 30, 2015, Coke signed a minor league contract with the Toronto Blue Jays, and was assigned to the Triple-A Buffalo Bisons. On June 11, the Blue Jays purchased Coke's contract from Triple-A. He took the mound for the first time with Toronto on June 14, pitching two scoreless innings in a 13–5 win over the Boston Red Sox. He became a free agent again on June 22, after he declined his minor-league assignment by the Blue Jays.

Oakland Athletics
On June 27, 2015, Coke signed a minor league deal with the Oakland Athletics. He was assigned to the Triple-A Nashville Sounds, but was released on August 18.

Atlanta Braves
Coke signed a minor league contract with the Atlanta Braves on March 11, 2016. On March 26, 2016, he was released.

Lancaster Barnstormers
On April 10, 2016, Coke signed with the Lancaster Barnstormers of the Atlantic League of Professional Baseball.

Return to the Yankees
On April 25, 2016, the Yankees acquired Coke from the Atlantic League, and assigned him to Scranton/Wilkes-Barre. The Yankees promoted Coke to the major leagues on May 6. He was designated for assignment on May 17. On May 20, he was outrighted from the 40-man roster and optioned to Triple-A Scranton/Wilkes Barre.

Pittsburgh Pirates
On September 22, 2016, the Pirates acquired Coke from the Yankees for cash considerations.

Orix Buffaloes
On December 13, 2016, Coke signed with the Orix Buffaloes of Nippon Professional Baseball.

On December 2, 2017, he became a free agent.

Acereros de Monclova
On March 22, 2018, Coke signed with the Acereros de Monclova of the Mexican League. He was released on May 4, 2018.

In August 2018, Coke underwent Tommy John surgery.

Pitch selection
Coke throws mainly four-seam and two-seam fastballs. His four-seamer is thrown in the  range, occasionally reaching . The two-seamer is a shade slower, averaging .

Personal life
Coke married Bobbie Brough in 2011.

References

External links

1982 births
Living people
Acereros de Monclova players
American expatriate baseball players in Canada
American expatriate baseball players in Japan
American expatriate baseball players in Mexico
Baseball players from California
Buffalo Bisons (minor league) players
Charleston RiverDogs players
Chicago Cubs players
Delta College Mustangs baseball players
Detroit Tigers players
Gulf Coast Yankees players
Major League Baseball pitchers
Mexican League baseball pitchers
Nashville Sounds players
New York Yankees players
Nippon Professional Baseball pitchers
Orix Buffaloes players
People from Sonora, California
Pittsburgh Pirates players
Scranton/Wilkes-Barre Yankees players
Staten Island Yankees players
Stockton Ports players
Tampa Yankees players
Toledo Mud Hens players
Toronto Blue Jays players
Trenton Thunder players